Nonprofit studies is a multidisciplinary field of teaching and research that focuses on practices of the nonprofit sector and can date back to the 1920s. This area of inquiry examines the management and effectiveness of the nonprofit sector, and has sub-areas of research including administration, marketing, communication, economics, human resources, philanthropy, ethics, law, information technology, social entrepreneurship, grant writing, policy, fundraising, advocacy, volunteerism, data research, and civic engagement.

A variety of higher education institutions and research organizations are dedicated to the teaching and research of issues related to the nonprofit sector.  Degrees related to nonprofit studies are offered at undergraduate, graduate and doctorate levels. Additionally, individual courses within related disciplines (e.g. Business, Communication Studies, Sociology, Public Policy) examine nonprofit studies in a variety of contexts.

Nonprofit studies may also refer to studies of the voluntary sector, third sector, nongovernmental organizations, or civil society.

Methods in the field of nonprofit studies

Research

Teaching and learning
 
Expert professors with experience in the nonprofit sector provide effective learning material for students in nonprofit studies. These professors have gained credible knowledge from working in, and doing research on nonprofit organizations. Other professors in nonprofit studies tend to also be a part of sociology, psychology, or public administration departments.

Curriculum in nonprofit studies programs vary from program to program with a heavy emphasis in management above other content areas mentioned above. Suggestions for curriculum guidelines include the topics of:
 Understanding the context of the sector
 History
 Size and scope; international comparisons
 Legal and regulatory context
 Managing external relationships
 Policy and advocacy
 Community development
 Fund development and financial sustainability
 Marketing and public relations
 Communications* Managing the Nonprofit Organization
 General management, both tactical and strategic
 Human resources and volunteer management
 Financial management and accounting
 Organizational behaviour
 Program planning and evaluation
 Earned revenue/social enterprise
 Governance
 Analytic methods* Being an effective leader
 Personal leadership
 Ethics and values
Community Organizing

In many nonprofit studies programs, experiential learning opportunities complement classroom learning. Students may take part in internships or co-operative education placements where they learn by working alongside staff in a nonprofit workplace. Community-based learning activities such as service-learning, community-based research, volunteering, and participatory action research can enhance the learning process by combining experiential learning and skill building with critical reflection on self and social/environment injustice.

Nonprofit management education research

 For a list of articles, reviews, and other citations on nonprofit management education, click here or here.
 For a list of research on nonprofit management education by Mirabella and Wish, click here.
 For a general bibliography on nonprofit management education, click here.

Nonprofit research

Academic journals 
 Annals of Public and Cooperative Economics
 ANSERJ - Canadian Journal of Nonprofit and Social Economy Research / Revue canadienne de recherche sur les OSBL et l'économie sociale
 The Foundation Review
 International Journal of Nonprofit and Voluntary Sector Marketing
 Nonprofit and Voluntary Sector Quarterly
 Nonprofit Management & Leadership
 Voluntas

Associations and organizations
 Association for Research on Nonprofit Organizations and Voluntary Action (ARNOVA)
 Association for Nonprofit and Social Economy Research (ANSER) (Canada)
 International Society for Third-Sector Research (ISTR)

Centers and institutes

Asia/Middle East 
 Israeli Centre for Third-Sector Research: Ben-Gurion University of the Negev, (Beer Sheva, Israel)
 Center for the Study of Philanthropy in Israel: The Hebrew University of Jerusalem (Israel)

Africa
 John D. Gerhart Center for Philanthropy and Civic Engagement: The American University in Cairo (Egypt)

Australia
 Centre for Australian Community Organisations and Management: University of Technology, Sydney (Australia)
 The Australian Centre for Philanthropy and Nonprofit Studies: Queensland University of Technology (Brisbane, Australia)

Canada
 Centre for Voluntary Sector Studies: Ryerson University (Toronto, ON)
 Institute for Nonprofit Studies: Mount Royal College (Calgary, AB)
 School of Policy Studies Public Policy and Third Sector Initiative: Queen's University (Kingston, ON)
 Sprott Centre for Social Entreprises / Centre Sprott pour les entreprises sociales (SCSE/CSES): Carleton University, Sprott School of Business (Ottawa, ON)

Europe
 Verbandsmanagement Institut: University of Fribourg (Fribourg, Switzerland)
 Center for Philanthropy Studies: University of Basel (Basel, Switzerland)
 Centre for Nonprofit Management: Trinity College, University of Dublin (Ireland)
 Centre for Nonprofit Sector Research: Masaryk University (Brno, Czechia)
 Centre for the Study of Philanthropy: VU University Amsterdam
 Maecenata Institute for Philanthropy and Civil Society: Humboldt University (Berlin, Germany)

United States
 Caster Family Center for Nonprofit Research in the Institute for Nonprofit Education and Research: University of San Diego (CA)
 Center for Civil Society: University of California, Los Angeles
 Indiana University Lilly Family School of Philanthropy: Indiana University-Purdue University Indianapolis
Dorothy A. Johnson Center for Philanthropy: Grand Valley State University
Center on Philanthropy and Civil Society: The City University of New York (New York, NY)
 Center on Philanthropy and Public Policy: University of Southern California (Los Angeles, CA)
 Helen Bader Institute for Nonprofit Management: University of Wisconsin-Milwaukee
 Institute for Human Services & Public Policy: Louisiana State University in Shreveport
 Institute for Nonprofit Organization Management: University of San Francisco (CA)
 Johns Hopkins Center for Civil Society Studies: Johns Hopkins University (Baltimore, MD)
 Lodestar Center for Philanthropy & Nonprofit Innovation: Arizona State University (Phoenix, AZ)
 Nancy Bell Evans Center on Nonprofits & Philanthropy: University of Washington  (Seattle,WA)
 Nonprofit Management: Milano The New School for Management and Urban Policy (New York, NY)
 Center for Nonprofit and NGO Studies: Northern Illinois University (DeKalb, IL)
 Nonprofit Minor/Certificate: University of Washington (Seattle, WA)
 RGK Center for Philanthropy and Community Service: University of Texas (Austin, TX)

Conferences
 Association for Nonprofit and Social Economy Research (ANSER) Annual Conference (Canada)
 Association for Research on Nonprofit Organizations and Voluntary Action (ARNOVA) Annual Conference

Awards, scholarships and funding

 Lester M. Salamon Emerging Scholar Dissertation Award
 Award for Distinguished Achievement and Leadership in Nonprofit and Voluntary Action Research
 Gabriel G. Rudney Memorial Award for Outstanding Dissertation in Nonprofit and Voluntary Action Research
 Outstanding Article in Nonprofit and Voluntary Sector Quarterly (NVSQ)
 Outstanding Book in Nonprofit and Voluntary Action Research
 Virginia A. Hodgkinson Research Book Prize

Academic degree programs

Canada 
 Master / Diploma in Philanthropy and Nonprofit Leadership: Carleton University (Ottawa, ON)
 MBA in Nonprofit Management and Leadership: York University (Toronto, ON)
 Bachelor of Applied Nonprofit Studies: Mount Royal College (Calgary, AB)

United States
An extensive list of doctoral, masters, and undergraduate nonprofit degree programs in the US has been compiled by Dr. Roseanne Mirabella of Seton Hall University. The list can be found here.

Indiana

Indiana University Lilly Family School of Philanthropy Academic Programs: The Lilly Family School of Philanthropy’s degree programs bring together an understanding of how philanthropy works with why people give. The School emphasizes a comprehensive approach to the study of philanthropy in society that gives you the knowledge and understanding to be active in the nonprofit field. This broad approach gives you more choices throughout your life to pursue your passions and improve your community locally or globally. Learn more.

Illinois

Northern Illinois University Nonprofit and NGO Studies: The Center for Nonprofit and Non-Governmental Organization Studies (formerly known as Community Leadership and Civic Engagement) offers a wide range of interdisciplinary courses that teach and promote leadership and involvement in the nonprofit sector and international nonprofit organizations. Because the program is interdisciplinary, students have the option to take courses from other departments such as political science, environmental studies, communications, business, marketing, and history. Nonprofit and NGO Studies at Northern Illinois University is a program that offers a degree under a Bachelors of Arts and a Bachelors of Science upon completion of a select amount of credit hours for the program and university requirements.

Europe
 Postgraduate Programme in Philanthropic Studies: VU University Amsterdam
 Philanthropic Studies (Distance Learning) - PCert, PDip, MA: University of Kent (Canterbury, UK)

References

 Weber, P. C., & Witkowsky, G. R. (2016). Philanthropic Disruptions: Changing Non-Profit Education for an Engaged Society. Journal of Public Affairs Education,22(1), 91-106. Retrieved April 30, 2018.

Studies
Volunteering
Social philosophy